The following is a list of media relating to the anime and manga series Trigun by Yasuhiro Nightow.

Manga

Anime

Music
Trigun features music by Tsuneo Imahori.

Soundtracks

Trigun: The First Donuts

Official disc data here and here. All tracks performed by Dr. Donuts except track 10 by AJA and track 11 by AKIMA & NEOS.

Trigun: The 2nd Donut Happy Pack

Official disc data. Tracks 2, 3, 5, 7, 9, 10, 12, 13, 15, 17, 19, 20, 22 and 23 performed by The Dr. Donut. Tracks 1, 4, 6, 8, 11, 14, 16, 18 and 21 are short audio dramas (in Japanese), rather than music. Helpful translation of audio drama

 ラヴ&ピース (Love and Peace)
 Nerve Rack
 楽園 (Paradise)
 ウエスト·スラング (West Slang)
 Unhappy Song
 黒猫空間 (Kuroneko[Black Cat] Space)
 Colorless Sky
 トライガン·マキシマム (Trigun Maximum)
 Hash Hash
 Lost Planet
 Blue Spring
 H.T. (Destroyingangel mix)
 Zero Hour
 Insurance #1
 The Lowdown
 Insurance #2
 Gunpowder Tea
 Insurance #3
 Cheers!
 Scattered Rain
 ピアス (Piercing)
 Blue Summers
 砂の星 (Star of Sand)

Trigun Spicy Stewed Donut

A compilation of the two soundtracks released in Japan, published in the U.S. only, from Tokyopop. Includes a booklet with images and information on the series, and a sticker with original Nightow artwork.

 H.T.
 NO-BEAT
 Big Bluff
 Unhappy Song
 PHILOSOPHY In A Tea Cup
 Cynical Pink
 Nerve Rack
 Zero Hour
 KNIVES
 Permanent Vacation
 BLUE FUNK
 YELLOW ALERT
 Carot & Stick
 Suna-no-hoshi
 Kaze-wa Mirai-ni Fuku (風は未来に吹く / Wind Blows In the Future)

Theme songs
 Opening  "H.T." written and arranged by Tsuneo Imahori.
 Ending  "Wind Blows to the Future" (風は未来に吹く Kaze wa Mirai ni Fuku) written, composed, arranged, and sung by Akima & Neos.
 Character development  "Sound Life" by Tsuneo Imahori - associated with the character of Rem, and by extension Vash's early life. It is a story of the development of a world, starting on the first evening and ending on the eighth morning (something like the Bible story of creation). The final verse of the song (in Japanese) is: Saa...atarashii sora ni subete wo shirushita kumikyoku ga hibiku, which translates to "Well then...A song that has recorded everything echoes to the new sky." The song has been on the planet for as long as humans have.

Games
A video game, Trigun: The Planet Gunsmoke, was announced in 2002 by Sega and to be developed by Red Entertainment. While never officially canceled, there have been no mentions of the game since its original announcement.

Canadian company Guardians of Order released a hardbound role-playing game (RPG) book in December 2003 based on the Trigun TV series. This was not a self-contained RPG rulebook, but worked with the company's BESM anime RPG rule set. The book contains summaries of all 26 episodes of the TV series, along with character profiles, animation model sheets, production sketches, and color images from the series.

References

External links

Media
Mass media by franchise